Asanada is a genus of centipedes in the subfamily Scolopendrinae. It can be distinguished from the genus Cormocephalus (= Cupipes) by having smooth (as opposed to punctured) anal pleurae, but is otherwise quite similar in appearance. The type species of the genus is A. brevicornis (by monotypy), the type specimen of which was collected in Kulu, India.

Species

References 

Centipede genera